Rhodopetoma is a genus of sea snails, marine gastropod mollusks in the family Pseudomelatomidae.

Species
Species within the genus Rhodopetoma include:
 Rhodopetoma diaulax (Dall, 1908)
 Rhodopetoma erosa (Schrenck, 1862)
 Rhodopetoma renaudi (Arnold, 1903)
Species brought into synonymy
 Rhodopetoma akkeshiensis Habe, 1958: synonym of Ophiodermella akkeshiensis (Habe, 1958)
 Rhodopetoma rhodope (Dall, 1919): synonym of Rhodopetoma diaulax (Dall, 1908)

References

External links
  Bartsch, P, Some turrid mollusks of Monterey Bay and vicinity; Proceedings of the Biological Society of Washington, v. 57 p. 57-68
 
 Bouchet, P.; Kantor, Y. I.; Sysoev, A.; Puillandre, N. (2011). A new operational classification of the Conoidea (Gastropoda). Journal of Molluscan Studies. 77(3): 273-308
 Worldwide Mollusc Species Data Base: Pseudomelatomidae

 
Pseudomelatomidae
Gastropod genera